Letun (Russian: Летун) was one of eight s built for the Russian Imperial Navy during World War I. Completed in 1916, she served with the Baltic Fleet during the war, but struck a naval mine in October that crippled her. The ship was under repair in Reval, Estonia, when the Soviets evacuated the city. Abandoned, Letun was broken up for scrap in 1927.

Bibliography 

 
 

Orfey-class destroyers
Destroyers of the Imperial Russian Navy
Ships built in Russia
1915 ships
World War I destroyers of Russia